Khomam District is a district (bakhsh) in Khomam County, Gilan Province, Iran. At the 2006 census, its population was 52,050, in 15,059 families.  The District has one city: Khomam.  The District has three rural districts (dehestan): Chapar Khaneh Rural District, Chukam Rural District, and Kateh Sar-e Khomam Rural District.

References 

Rasht County
Districts of Gilan Province